Great Heavens (foaled 28 April 2009) is a British Thoroughbred racehorse who won the 2012 Irish Oaks. She is owned by Lady Rothschild and trained by John Gosden.

Breeding
Great Heavens is the daughter of Galileo, who won The Derby, Irish Derby and King George and multiple Champion sire. Galileo's sire was Sadler's Wells, winner of the Eclipse Stakes and Irish Champion Stakes and multiple Champion sire.

Great Heavens' dam Magnificient Style is the daughter of Silver Hawk. Great Heavens is a full-sister to King George and Eclipse winner Nathaniel. She is also the half-sister to Fillies' Mile winner Playful Act and Sun Chariot Stakes winner Echoes in Eternity.

Racing career
Great Heavens only started once as a two-year-old, finishing in fifth place in an eight furlong Haydock maiden. Starting her three-year-old season in a Yarmouth maiden she won comfortable from Monshak. She then started the Listed Lord Weinstock Memorial Stakes at Newbury as the 11/8 favourite. Under jockey William Buick she made all the running and won unchallenged. Great Heavens then faced eight rivals in the Lancashire Oaks where she was the 11/4 favourite. She again made all the running and won impressively, beating Pinnacle Stakes winner Shimmering Surf by five lengths.

After this performance she was sent off the 5/4 favourite in the Irish Oaks. The Ribblesdale Stakes winner Princess Highway was at 9/4, with Epsom Oaks winner Was at 5/1 and Epsom Oaks second Shirocco Star at 7/1. As the field of seven turned into the finishing straight Great Heavens was in fifth place. She ran on strongly in the final furlong and took the lead with 100 yards to run. She then drew clear to win by three lengths from Shirocco Star.

On 4 October, Great Heavens' owners paid a supplementary entry fee of €100,000 to run the filly in the Prix de l'Arc de Triomphe. She started the 7.5/1 fourth favourite and fared the best of the British and Irish challengers as she finished sixth behind the upset winner Solemia.

Pedigree

Note: b. = Bay, ch. = Chestnut, gr. = Grey

* Great Heavens is inbred 4x4 to Nearctic. This means that the stallion appears twice in the fourth generation of her pedigree.

References

2009 racehorse births
Racehorses bred in the United Kingdom
Racehorses trained in the United Kingdom
Irish Classic Race winners
Thoroughbred family 9-f